The 1990–91 Georgia Tech Yellow Jackets men's basketball team represented the Georgia Institute of Technology during the 1990–91 NCAA men's basketball season. Led by 10th year head coach Bobby Cremins and point guard Kenny Anderson, the Yellow Jackets reached the second round of the NCAA tournament.

Roster

Schedule

|-
!colspan=9 style=| Non-conference regular season

|-
!colspan=9 style=| ACC Regular Season
|-

|-
!colspan=9 style=| ACC tournament

|-
!colspan=9 style=| NCAA tournament

Rankings

Players in the 1991 NBA draft

References

Georgia Tech Yellow Jackets men's basketball seasons
Georgia Tech
Georgia Tech